Domenico Pittis (born October 1, 1974) is a Canadian former professional ice hockey centre. He is currently an assistant coach with the Calgary Wranglers in the American Hockey League (AHL).

Playing career
As a youth, Pittis played in the 1988 Quebec International Pee-Wee Hockey Tournament with a minor ice hockey team from Calgary.

He was selected by the Pittsburgh Penguins in the second round (52nd overall) of the 1993 NHL Entry Draft.

After playing three seasons with the Lethbridge Hurricanes of the Western Hockey League and three more in the International Hockey League, Pittis appeared in one game in the NHL with the Penguins during the 1996–97 season. Pittis spent the next seven seasons mostly in the American Hockey League, appearing intermittently in the NHL with the Buffalo Sabres, Edmonton Oilers, and Nashville Predators. In total, he has appeared in 86 NHL games. He has scored five goals and added 11 assists.

He played for Team Canada at the 2007 Spengler Cup.

Pittis played two seasons in Switzerland, playing in Nationalliga A with the Kloten Flyers. In the 2009-2010 season, he joined ZSC Lions of the Swiss National League A, leading the team to becoming Victoria Cup champions. He is currently the team's top scorer. In 2012, he joined the team EHC Visp Nationalliga B and subsequently signed a multi-year deal extending his contract until 2015.

On September 1, 2013, Pittis announced his retirement from professional hockey. As of the 2013-2014 season, he is now employed by the Calgary Flames as an Assistant coach for their AHL affiliate the Stockton Heat.

Awards
 WHL East Second All-Star Team – 1994
 John B. Sollenberger Trophy (top scorer in American Hockey League): 1998–99 season.

 Rochester Americans Hall of Fame inductee January 31st 2020.

Career statistics

References

External links

1974 births
Living people
Buffalo Sabres players
Calgary Flames coaches
Canadian ice hockey centres
Cleveland Lumberjacks players
Edmonton Oilers players
EHC Visp players
EV Zug players
Ice hockey people from Calgary
EHC Kloten players
Lethbridge Hurricanes players
Long Beach Ice Dogs (IHL) players
Nashville Predators players
Milwaukee Admirals players
Pittsburgh Penguins draft picks
Pittsburgh Penguins players
Rochester Americans players
Syracuse Crunch players
ZSC Lions players
Canadian expatriate ice hockey players in Switzerland
Canadian ice hockey coaches